South Brook Water Aerodrome  is located on the shores of Deer Lake, Newfoundland and Labrador, Canada and is open from May until the middle of November.

References

Registered aerodromes in Newfoundland and Labrador
Seaplane bases in Newfoundland and Labrador